Simon Beyeler (born 11 June 1982 in Bern) is a Swiss sport shooter. At the 2008 Summer Olympics, he competed in the Men's 10 metre air rifle.  In the 2012 Summer Olympics he competed in the Men's 10 metre air rifle and the Men's 50 metre rifle 3 positions.

References

Swiss male sport shooters
Living people
Olympic shooters of Switzerland
Shooters at the 2008 Summer Olympics
Shooters at the 2012 Summer Olympics
Place of birth missing (living people)
Shooters at the 2015 European Games
European Games competitors for Switzerland
1982 births
Sportspeople from Bern
21st-century Swiss people